Simyra splendida is a moth of the family Noctuidae. It is found in central Asia, from China to Tibet, Mongolia, the Korean Peninsula, the Russian Far East (Primorye, Amur region), southern Kazakhstan and southern Siberia (Transbaikalia).

External links
Korean Insects

Simyra (moth)
Moths described in 1888